Rosso corsa is the red international motor racing colour of cars entered by teams from Italy.

Since the 1920s Italian race cars of Alfa Romeo, Maserati, Lancia, and later Ferrari and Abarth have been painted in rosso corsa ("racing red"). This was the customary national racing colour of Italy as recommended between the world wars by the organisations that later became the FIA. In that scheme of international auto racing colours French cars were blue (Bleu de France), British cars were green (British racing green), etc.

History
In the Peking to Paris race of 1907, the first to arrive in Paris was Prince Scipione Borghese, an Italian aristocrat. He was accompanied by Luigi Barzini, a journalist who worked for The Daily Telegraph, and a valet, Ettore Guizzardi, who acted as his mechanic and traveled with a supply of Lanson champagne. The prince was so confident of winning that he took a detour of several hundred miles from Moscow to St Petersburg for a dinner in honour of the team, and afterwards headed back to Moscow and rejoined the race. Their chief rival was Charles Goddard, a fairground worker and con artist who, until he learned of the race from a scrap of newspaper he found blowing in the wind, had never sat in a motor car and who was arrested for fraud as he approached the finishing line. 

Goddard, who came second, lacked the resources of Borghese and had to beg fellow competitors for fuel. In a desperate attempt to catch up, he set an endurance record for non-stop driving for 24 hours. The prince's prize was simply a magnum of Mumm champagne, and the red colour of his 1907 Itala car was adopted by Italy as its racing colour in his honour.

In Formula One, the colour was not determined by the country the car was made in nor by the nationality of the driver(s) but by the nationality of the team entering the vehicle. A Ferrari 156 car painted in Belgian racing yellow colour was entered and driven as a private car in the 1961 Belgian Grand Prix by the Belgian driver Olivier Gendebien, scoring 4th behind three other Ferrari cars painted in red as they were entered by the Scuderia Ferrari works team itself, and driven by US drivers Phil Hill and Richie Ginther as well as German Wolfgang von Trips.

Ferrari won the 1964 World championship with John Surtees by competing the last two races (the United States Grand Prix and Mexican Grand Prix) in Ferrari 158 cars painted white with blue lengthwise "Cunningham racing stripes" -the national colours of the teams licensed in the United States- as these were entered not by the Italian factory themselves but by the American NART team. This was done as a protest against the agreement between Ferrari and the Italian Racing Authorities regarding their planned mid-engined Ferrari race car.

From 1996 to 2007 Ferrari F1 cars were painted in a brighter, almost orange day-glo to adjust for colour balance on television screens. The original Rosso Corsa may appear almost dark brown in older television sets. The Rosso corsa shade of red made a return on the F1 cars at the 2007 Monaco Grand Prix, possibly in line with the increasing market presence of higher quality high definition television.

Italian motorcycle company Ducati is also features this color as one of their main colors both in its racing motorcycles such as the Ducati Desmosedici and in its road bikes such as the Ducati Panigale V2. 

Red cars are also traditional in Alfa Romeo and Ferrari car running in other motorsport championships, such as Supertouring championships in the former and the 24 Hours of Le Mans and 24 Hours of Daytona in the latter. In contrast, since the 2000s Maserati has been using white and blue and Abarth has been using white with red flashes. Rosso Corsa is also an extremely popular colour choice for Ferrari road cars, nearly 80% of all Ferraris sold are in the colour.

Gallery

See also
List of colours
List of international auto racing colors

Notes

References

Further reading

Shades of red
Motorsport in Italy
National symbols of Italy